Jang Young-soo (Hangul: 장영수; born 21 August 1982) is a South Korean badminton player. He was the gold medalists at the 2002 Busan Asian Games. Jang who educated at the Inha University won the men's singles title at the Summer National Championships in 2003. He later won the 51st and 55th National Championships men's singles title. He won his first international title at the 2003 Hungarian International tournament. In December 2018, Jang who is a trainer in Gimcheon city, was appointed as a South Korea national coach.

Achievements

IBF International 
Men's singles

References

External links 
 

1982 births
Living people
South Korean male badminton players
Badminton players at the 2002 Asian Games
Asian Games gold medalists for South Korea
Asian Games medalists in badminton
Medalists at the 2002 Asian Games
Badminton coaches